Robert H. Ahmanson (February 14, 1927 – September 1, 2007) was an American businessman and philanthropist from Los Angeles, California. He was a corporate director of H.F. Ahmanson & Co. and served as the President of The Ahmanson Foundation from 1974 to 2007.

Biography

Early life
Robert H. Ahmanson was born on February 14, 1927, in Omaha, Nebraska. He graduated from the University of California, Los Angeles (UCLA) in 1949. He had a brother, William H. Ahmanson. His father served as the President of the National American Insurance Co. of Omaha. His uncle, Howard F. Ahmanson, Sr., was the founder of H.F. Ahmanson & Co., an insurance and savings and loans corporation based in Los Angeles.

Business career
He served on the Board of Directors of H.F. Ahmanson & Co. until 1995.

Philanthropy
He served on the board of trustees of The Ahmanson Foundation from 1952 to 2007, and as its president from 1974 to 2007. He also served on the board of trustees of the Jules Stein Eye Institute and the Brain Mapping Medical Research Organization. Moreover, he served on the board of trustees of the Los Angeles County Museum of Art (LACMA).

A supporter of education, he served on the board of trustees of the Marlborough School. Additionally, he served on the board of governors of the UCLA Foundation. He was a Fellow of the College of Letters & Science at UCLA and a recipient of the UCLA Medal. He was the recipient of honorary doctorates from the Hebrew University of Jerusalem, Pepperdine University, the Art Center College of Design and Creighton University.

Personal life
He was married to Kathleen Ahmanson for fifty-two years. They had two sons, William Ahmanson and Robert Hayden Ahmanson, and a daughter, Karen Ahmanson Hoffman.

Death
He died on September 1, 2007, in Los Angeles, California. He was buried in Omaha, Nebraska.

Legacy
His son William H. Ahmanson serves as the President of The Ahmanson Foundation.

References

1927 births
2007 deaths
Businesspeople from Omaha, Nebraska
Businesspeople from Los Angeles
University of California, Los Angeles alumni
American corporate directors
Philanthropists from California
20th-century American philanthropists
20th-century American businesspeople